Thalita da Silva Costa (born 30 May 1997) is a Brazilian rugby union player.

Personal life
Her twin sister Thalia Costa also plays rugby sevens for Brazil. They were born in São Luís.

Career
She was first called up to the national team in 2019, and was named in the Brazil squad for the 2020 Summer Olympics.

References 

1997 births
Living people
Brazilian female rugby union players
Olympic rugby sevens players of Brazil
Rugby sevens players at the 2020 Summer Olympics
Twin sportspeople
Brazilian twins
People from São Luís, Maranhão
Brazil international women's rugby sevens players
Brazilian rugby sevens players
Sportspeople from Maranhão